OOPSTAD was the Object Oriented Programming For Smalltalk Application Developers Association. It published the periodical HOOPLA!.

Object-oriented programming